The 1986 European Karate Championships, the 21st edition, was held  in Madrid, Spain from May 5 to 7, 1986.

Competition

Team

Team

Women's competition

Individual

Team

Medal table

References

External links
Karate Records - European Championship 1986
Nouvelle revue de Lausanne 17/02/1986

1986
International karate competitions hosted by Spain
European Karate Championships
European championships in 1986
Sports competitions in Madrid
1980s in Madrid
Karate competitions in Spain